A list of mountains in Greece:

See also
Mount Kythnos
Movri
Omplos
Pantokrator (Corfu)
Skollis

External links
Maps of mountains in Greece by Geopsis

Greece

Mountains
Greece